Halifax is a town in Halifax County, North Carolina, United States. The population was 234 at the 2010 census. It is the county seat of Halifax County. It is known as "The Birthplace of Freedom" for being the location for the April 12, 1776, adoption of the Halifax Resolves, which was the first official action by a colony calling for independence.  Halifax is also home to the Halifax Historic District, a historic site operated by the North Carolina Department of Cultural Resources. Halifax is part of the Roanoke Rapids, North Carolina Micropolitan Statistical Area.

Geography
Halifax is located at  (36.328397, −77.590732).

Halifax is located on the Roanoke River, near the Fall Line between the Piedmont and Coastal Plain regions of North Carolina. This location near the head of navigation for the Roanoke, was important in the town's early development.

Today the river is a major recreational asset, with exceptional fishing opportunities, especially with the annual Spring Rockfish (striped bass) and shad runs. Fishermen from all over the country come to the Roanoke for these annual fishing opportunities. Additionally, the Roanoke also provides recreational opportunities in the form of three large impoundments—Kerr, Gaston, and Roanoke Rapids Reservoirs—located just upstream of Halifax. Other recreational and historical attractions in the area include Halifax State Historic Site, Medoc Mountain State Park, and Sylvan Heights Waterfowl Park. The outdoor drama First For Freedom is performed annually in the summer.

Halifax enjoys a four-season climate, with moderately hot and humid summers, and cool winters. The area averages  of snow annually, and historically has been subject to ice storms. The area also is occasionally affected by the remnants of landfalling hurricanes and tropical storms. Overall, however, the area has a temperate climate, usually without major extremes.

Demographics

2020 census

As of the 2020 United States census, there were 170 people, 82 households, and 45 families residing in the town.

2000 census
As of the census of 2000, there were 344 people, 103 households, and 73 families residing in the town. Preliminary Data from the 2010 Census indicates a declining population. The population density was 761.5 people per square mile (295.2/km2). There were 123 housing units at an average density of 272.3 per square mile (105.5/km2). The racial makeup of the town was 63.37% White, 35.17% African American, 0.29% Native American, 0.58% from other races, and 0.58% from two or more races. Hispanic or Latino of any race were 0.58% of the population.

There were 103 households, out of which 29.1% had children under the age of 18 living with them, 64.1% were married couples living together, 3.9% had a female householder with no husband present, and 28.2% were non-families. 26.2% of all households were made up of individuals, and 11.7% had someone living alone who was 65 years of age or older. The average household size was 2.29 and the average family size was 2.76.

In the town, the population was spread out, with 17.7% under the age of 18, 15.1% from 18 to 24, 33.4% from 25 to 44, 19.2% from 45 to 64, and 14.5% who were 65 years of age or older. The median age was 36 years. For every 100 females, there were 126.3 males. For every 100 females age 18 and over, there were 137.8 males.

The median income for a household in the town was $36,429, and the median income for a family was $47,917. Males had a median income of $24,063 versus $29,000 for females. The per capita income for the town was $14,041. About 14.3% of families and 26.0% of the population were below the poverty line, including 23.3% of those under age 18 and 16.3% of those age 65 or over.

History 
Halifax was established in 1757. It was named for George Montagu-Dunk, 2nd Earl of Halifax, President of the Board of Trade from 1748 to 1761. In January 1759 it became the county seat of the new Halifax County. The town developed into a commercial and political center at the time of the American Revolution. North Carolina's Fourth Provincial Congress met in Halifax in the spring of 1776, and on April 12 adopted the Halifax Resolves.

The Church of the Immaculate Conception and the Michael Ferrall Family Cemetery, William R. Davie House, Eagle Tavern, Halifax County Courthouse, Halifax County Home and Tubercular Hospital, Halifax Historic District, Sally-Billy House, and St. Mark's Episcopal Church are listed on the National Register of Historic Places.

On March 9, 2015, an Amtrak passenger train collided with a tractor trailer in Halifax, with part of the train derailing. 55 passengers were injured.

References

 
Towns in Halifax County, North Carolina
Towns in North Carolina
County seats in North Carolina
Populated places established in 1757
Roanoke Rapids, North Carolina micropolitan area
Historic Albemarle Tour